Carmen Keith Conners (March 20, 1933 – July 5, 2017) was an American psychologist, best known for establishing the first standards for the diagnosis of attention deficit hyperactivity disorder (ADHD).

Conners was born on March 20, 1933, in Bingham Canyon, Utah, one of three children of Michael Conners, a machinist, and Merle Conners, who worked in a department store.  He earned degrees from the University of Chicago (BA), University of Oxford (MA), and Harvard University (PhD).

Conners is credited by many as putting ADHD on the map in the USA.  In later years, he raised concerns about the high rates of diagnosis of ADHD in the United States as compared to Europe, and suggested that ADHD may be diagnosed too frequently in the US   
He believed the true rates of childhood ADHD were 2-3%.

Conners died on July 5, 2017 in Durham, North Carolina, aged 84.

References

1933 births
2017 deaths
People from Bingham Canyon, Utah
People from Durham, North Carolina
20th-century American psychologists
University of Chicago alumni
Alumni of the University of Oxford
Harvard University alumni
American psychologists